In mathematics, a zonal polynomial is a multivariate symmetric homogeneous polynomial. The zonal polynomials form a basis of the space of symmetric polynomials.

They appear as zonal spherical functions of the Gelfand pairs

They are applied in multivariate statistics.

The zonal polynomials are the  case of the C normalization of the Jack function.

References

 Robb Muirhead, Aspects of Multivariate Statistical Theory, John Wiley & Sons, Inc., New York, 1984.

Homogeneous polynomials
Symmetric functions